Boquerón is a Cuban village and consejo popular ("people's council", i.e. hamlet) of the municipality of Caimanera, in the Province of Guantánamo. Located near Guantánamo Bay, it is also known as Mártires de la Frontera, Spanish for "Martyrs of the Border".

History
The village was founded in 1903 and developed urbanistically since the 1970s.

Geography
Boquerón, located in the eastern shore of the bay, is the nearest Cuban settlement to the Guantanamo Bay Naval Base. The North East Gate, located 4 km (2 miles) from it, is the only US-Cuban border crossing point. Due to its proximity to the US Base Boquerón is, along with Caimanera, a forbidden town needing a special permission from the government to visit it. 

Boquerón lies in front of 3 islets: Cayo Piedra, Cayo Ramón and Cayo Redondo. It is 12 km (7 miles) far from Caimanera and 28 km (18 miles) from Guantánamo.

Transport
The village is the southern terminal of a minor railway line from Guantánamo and counts a little port. It is linked with the Carretera Central highway (11 km; 7 miles far) by a road named "Carretera a Boquerón". Nearest airport, the "Mariana Grajales" of Guantánamo, is located 28 km (18 miles) in the north.

See also
Mata Abajo
List of cities in Cuba

References

External links

 Boquerón on EcuRed
Boquerón on Index Mundi

Populated places in Guantánamo Province
Cuba–United States border
Populated places established in 1903
1903 establishments in Cuba